Olearia muricata, commonly known as rough-leaved daisy bush, is a species of flowering plant in the family Asteraceae and is endemic to the south-west of Western Australia. It is an erect shrub with flat, linear to triangular leaves, and white or pale mauve and yellow, daisy-like inflorescences.

Description
Flowering occurs throughout the year and the fruit is an achene, the pappus with 30 to 39 long and 5 to 20 short bristles.

Taxonomy
Rough-leaved daisy bush was first formally described in 1845 by Joachim Steetz who gave it the name Eurybia muricata in Johann Georg Christian Lehmann's Plantae Preissianae, from specimens collected near Cape Riche in 1840. In 1867 George Bentham changed the name to Olearia muricata in Flora Australiensis. The specific epithet (muricata) means "rough, with short, hard points".

Distribution and habitat
Olearia muricata grows in woodland, mallee shrubland and low heath in the Avon Wheatbelt, Coolgardie, Esperance Plains, Geraldton Sandplains, Jarrah Forest, Mallee, Warren bioregions of south-western Western Australia.

Conservation status
Olearia mucronata is listed as "not threatened" by the Government of Western Australia Department of Biodiversity, Conservation and Attractions.

References

muricata
Flora of Western Australia
Plants described in 1845
Taxa named by Joachim Steetz